Sarnia—Lambton is a provincial electoral district in southwestern Ontario, Canada. It elects one member to the Legislative Assembly of Ontario.

The riding was created in 1999 from Sarnia and from part of Lambton when ridings in Ontario were redrawn to match federal ridings.

From 1999 to 2007, the riding consisted of the municipalities of Sarnia, Point Edward, St. Clair and Sarnia 45. For the 2007 election, it gained the municipalities of Petrolia, Plympton-Wyoming, Oil Springs and Enniskillen.

Members of Provincial Parliament

Election results

		

		

|align="left" colspan=2|Progressive Conservative gain from Liberal
|align="right"|Swing
|align="right"|+11.54

^ Change is from redistributed results

		

Swing: 4.80% from PC to Lib (Lib hold)

2007 electoral reform referendum

Sources

Elections Ontario Past Election Results
Map of riding for 2018 election

Ontario provincial electoral districts
Sarnia